Abantis contigua, the contiguous paradise skipper, is a butterfly in the family Hesperiidae. It is found in Cameroon, the Republic of the Congo, Angola, the Democratic Republic of the Congo, Uganda, western Kenya and Zambia (from the north-west to the Copperbelt). The habitat consists of deciduous woodland.

References

Butterflies described in 1937
Tagiadini